The Movement of the People, commonly abbreviated as MOP or M.O.P, is a Nigerian left-wing pan-African political movement.  The organisation was originally formed by Fela Anikulapo Kuti in 1979 as a political party but quickly became inactive due to Fela's confrontations with the government of the day.  It has since been revived by Fela's youngest son, Seun Kuti in the wake of the Nigerian End SARS protests of October 2020.

History 
In 1979, Fela Kuti formed a political movement, which he called Movement of the People (MOP), to "clean up society like a mop". MOP preached Nkrumahism and Africanism. In 1979, he nominated himself for president in Nigeria's first elections in decades, but his candidature was refused.  Subsequently, Fela stopped engaging in political activities and the party became inactive.

In November 2020, Seun Kuti announced the revival of the organisation and the intention to re-register it as a political party.  He said that the organisation was being re-established to serve as an opposition to the country’s elites.  During a live press conference, Seun explained that the Movement of the People (MOP) was a coalition of socialist and progressive organisations.  In January 2021, Seun informed the press that a formal request had been sent to INEC to register the movement as a political party.

References

Pan-Africanism in Nigeria
African and Black nationalist organizations in Africa
Politics of Nigeria
Fela Kuti
Decolonization
African philosophy
Anti-capitalist political parties
Far-left political parties
Political parties in Nigeria
Organizations established in 2020
National liberation movements in Africa
Pan-Africanist political parties in Africa
Left-wing parties
2021 establishments in Nigeria
Anti-imperialist organizations
Organizations based in Lagos
Political parties established in 2020